Floodgates, also called stop gates, are adjustable gates used to control water flow in flood barriers, reservoir, river, stream, or levee systems. They may be designed to set spillway crest heights in dams, to adjust flow rates in sluices and canals, or they may be designed to stop water flow entirely as part of a levee or storm surge system. Since most of these devices operate by controlling the water surface elevation being stored or routed, they are also known as crest gates. In the case of flood bypass systems, floodgates sometimes are also used to lower the water levels in a main river or canal channels by allowing more water to flow into a flood bypass or detention basin when the main river or canal is approaching a flood stage.

Types

Valves

Valves used in floodgate applications have a variety of design requirements and are usually located at the base of dams. Often, the most important requirement (besides regulating flow) is energy dissipation. Since water is very heavy, it exits the base of a dam with the enormous force of water pushing from above. Unless this energy is dissipated, the flow can erode nearby rock and soil and damage structures.

Other design requirements include taking into account pressure head operation, the flow rate, whether the valve operates above or below water, and the regulation of precision and cost.

Fixed cone valves are designed to dissipate the energy from a water flow during reservoir discharge. They are a round pipe section with an adjustable sleeve gate and cone at the discharge end. Flow is varied by moving the sleeve away or towards its cone seat. The design allows high pressure water from the base of a dam to be released without causing erosion to the surrounding environment. Fixed cone valves are able to handle heads up to 300 m.
Hollow jet valves are a type of needle valve used for floodgate discharge. A cone and seat are inside a pipe. Water flows through an annular gap between the pipe and cone when it is moved downstream, away from the seat. Ribs support the bulb assembly and supply air for water jet stabilization.
Ring jet valves are similar to fixed cone valves, but have an integral collar that discharges water in a narrow stream. They are suitable for heads up to 50 m.
Jet flow gate, similar to a gate valve but with a conical restriction prior to the gate leaf that focuses the water into a jet. They were developed in the 1940s by the United States Bureau of Reclamation to allow fine control of discharge flow without the cavitation seen in regular gate valves. Jet flow gates are able to handle heads up to 150 m.

Physics

The force on a rectangular flood gate can be calculated by the following equation:

where:
F = force measured in newtons (N) 
p = pressure   measured in pascal (Pa) 
where:
ρ is the density of fresh water (1000 kg/m3);
g is the acceleration due to gravity on Earth (9.8 m/s2 );
h is the height of the water column in metres.
A = area = rectangle: length × height measured in m2
where:
length = the horizontal length of a rectangular floodgate measured in metres
height = the height of a non-submerged flood gate from the bottom of the water column to the water surface measured in metres

If the rectangular flood gate is submerged below the surface the same equation can be used but only the height from the water surface to the middle of the gate must be used to calculate the force on the flood gate.

See also

Flood barrier
 Tidal barrage
 Canal lock
 Thames Barrier
 Delta Works
 Oosterscheldekering

References

Sources
 US Army Corps of Engineers. (31 July 1995). Engineering manual 1110-2-2607, Planning and Design of Navigation Dams, Chapter 5, Overview of gate types. Retrieved 2008-04-14.

External links
 DeltaWorks.Org – project in the Netherlands on floodgates

Dams
Hydrology
Water transport infrastructure
Flood barriers